Akzholtay Sports Palace (Aqjoltaı sport saraıy) is an ice hockey indoor arena in Karagandy, Kazakhstan. The former home arena of Avtomobilist Karagandy and Saryarka Karagandy hockey club.

References

Saryarka Karagandy
Indoor ice hockey venues in Kazakhstan